Bernard Chan Cheng Wah (born 8 October 1946) is a retired swimmer and water polo player from Singapore. He competed at the 1964 Summer Olympics for Malaysia in the 200 m butterfly and 4×100 m medley relay events, but failed to reach the finals.

Chan and his siblings were coached by their father, Chan Ah Kow, the Singaporean Coach of the Year in 1970 and 1971. His sister Patricia and brothers Alex and Roy competed at the Olympic and Asian Games. His other brother Mark Chan is a composer, whereas his other sister Victoria Chan-Palay became a prominent neuroscientist in the United States and Switzerland. His daughter Marina Chan is also an international swimmer.

References

1946 births
Living people
Olympic swimmers of Malaysia
Swimmers at the 1964 Summer Olympics
Singaporean male butterfly swimmers
Southeast Asian Games medalists in swimming
Southeast Asian Games silver medalists for Singapore
Southeast Asian Games gold medalists for Singapore
Competitors at the 1961 Southeast Asian Peninsular Games
Competitors at the 1965 Southeast Asian Peninsular Games